Evergestis insiola is a moth in the family Crambidae. It was described by Harrison Gray Dyar Jr. in 1925. It is found in Mexico.

References

Evergestis
Moths described in 1925
Moths of Central America